Epiblema angulatana is a moth belonging to the family Tortricidae. The species was first described by Julius von Kennel in 1901.

It is native to Russia.

References

Eucosmini
Moths described in 1901
Taxa named by Julius von Kennel